Empath (Manuel Alfonso Rodrigo de la Rocha) is a fictional mutant character appearing in American comic books published by Marvel Comics. The character is usually depicted as possessing the ability to control emotion in other people.

Publication history

Empath was created by Chris Claremont and Sal Buscema and first appeared in New Mutants  #16-17 (June–July 1984) as a member of Emma Frost's original Hellions.

Fictional character biography

Hellions
Empath is born in Castile, Spain. He is a mutant in the Marvel universe who attends school at the Massachusetts Academy, and is one of the original students of then-villain, the White Queen. Emma Frost's students, known as the Hellions, are rivals of Charles Xavier's students, the New Mutants. Manuel fancies Frost so much that during the night, he attempts to read her mind but she notices instantly, deciding to show him everything about her. Empath describes her as cold as ice. De la Rocha is one of the few Hellions, along with James Proudstar, Amara Aquilla, and Angelica Jones to survive an attack by time-travelling villain Trevor Fitzroy (although Empath's former teammate, Tarot is eventually resurrected).

The White Queen once uses Empath to manipulate Magneto into allowing the New Mutants to join the Hellions. This is made easier as the New Mutants were deeply traumatized by a powerful enemy known as the Beyonder. During the course of this plan, he meets two of Xavier's allies, Tom Corsi and Sharon Friedlander. He takes the opportunity to attack them mentally, changing a subtle attraction to full-blown obsessive sexual desire between the two. They show up several days later, severely traumatized.

During his tenure with the Hellions, de la Rocha meets and falls in love with Amara Aquilla, the New Mutant known as Magma. Aquilla eventually leaves her team and becomes a member of the Hellions, so that she can be close to de la Rocha. He even accompanies her back to her home in Nova Roma. The romance ends, however, when Aquilla realizes that de la Rocha was using his abilities to control her emotions. When the colony of Nova Roma is discovered to be a ruse by the witch Selene, Empath uses his abilities for a time to convince Magma that this is a hoax. This sets a bond of mistrust between the two that never is broken.

X-Corporation
Later, Empath joins X-Corporation and becomes the Communications Director for its Los Angeles chapter along with his former love Magma. However, after M-Day, Cyclops orders the closure of the X-Corporation headquarters to better focus all available resources on protecting their members and allies. Empath is one of the few mutants to retain their powers in the wake of House of M.

M-Day
After M-Day, Emma Frost uses Empath immediately to reel in Magma who, in her devastation over the death of her boyfriend because of the decimation, wrecked a South American village. Empath stays at the Xavier Institute along with some of the other 198, however his shared history with Magma makes her suspicious that he is still toying with her emotions. Later, when Johnny Dee uses his powers to control Magma and Leech and make them kill Mister M, Amara becomes aware that someone was controlling her, and, thinking it is Empath, blames him.

Manifest Destiny
Empath resurfaces in San Francisco leading a new group of regular humans calling themselves the Hellfire Cult who are conducting vicious attacks on mutants, despite him retaining his own mutant powers. However, he himself appears to be under the control of a mysterious woman called the Red Queen, with whom he shares an S&M sexual relationship. In the next issue she asks him about Emma Frost and then telepathically makes herself appear as Emma Frost as she sexually dominates Empath. When the X-Men discover the Hellfire Cult's base, she flees leaving Empath behind.Empath makes a run for it, and his powers seem to be going out of control. While being chased by various X-Men, he takes them down until Pixie appears and beats him savagely. She then stabs him in the head with her soulknife, weakening his powers and blinding him. He is held in prison-like quarters in the X-Men's HQ, frustrated over his condition and angry against the X-Men. Despite this and the deeds he has committed against her friends and herself, Amara takes pity upon him; hers is the only company Empath accepts.

It is later revealed that Empath was meant to be a Trojan Horse, whose rejuvenated powers disabled many of the X-Men, while the Red Queen and her Sisterhood took a locket of Jean Grey's hair. Pixie then attacked him again with her soulknife, shattering his consciousness.

Necrosha
Empath is moved to the X-Men's new Utopia prison, made out of Asteroid M, alongside Sebastian Shaw and Donald Pierce. He is trapped in a psychic illusion where he is with Amara, before the illusion is shattered when Selene's minions appear on Utopia's shores.

Dawn of X
Empath is later seen on Krakoa where he uses his powers to wreak havoc by manipulating his fellow Hellions into fighting each other, and also anyone who comes in his way, and as a result, he is assessed by the island's scientists and psychics. To their horror, they learned Empath is not a violent sociopath with an X-gene; rather, his X-gene transformed him into a violent sociopath. Because most people learn right or wrong by observing the reactions of others, swiftly realizing that negative behavior generates painful responses, when his X-gene activated at an unusually young age, it colored his natural development and psychological growth, so Empath had no way of learning these lessons. No matter what he did, no matter how much pain he caused, he only had to flex his mind and he would receive love and adulation. There were no consequences of abusing his powers, of taking advantage of others, and so he never had a way to learn right from wrong. Environmental cause and effect, the emotional data the mind requires to understand others, disappeared. As other mutants, whose powers are violent by nature, are also becoming a little out of control, the Quiet Council meet to discuss this matter, and the decision is to task Sinister with gathering a team to send into "therapeutic" missions where they are allowed to actually use their powers. The team's first mission is to destroy the now abandoned clone farm that Sinister left under the orphanage where Alex and Scott lived.

After the team enters the orphanage, Empath starts fooling around with Nanny's emotions which leads to her trying to 'nurse' Greycrow. Psylocke calls him out on it, but Greycrow has another answer to Manuel and shoots him straight in the head. He is soon afterwards resurrected by the Five.

He is killed again on his next two missions with the team. The first to Amenth through Otherworld to prevent Arakko from competing in Saturnyne's challenge, and the second against The Right where on his deathbed he reveals "Cameron Hodge" is actually just a robot duplicate.

The team eventually fights the Locus Vile, an Arakki group who wants to retrieve the DNA that was stolen from them by a clone of Sinister during their mission to Amenth. During this conflict several of Essex's secrets are brought to light such as his secret clone lab in Murderworld. Greycrow and Havok try to destroy the facility after finding out this, but Psylocke begs them not to, as he has a mental copy of her dead daughter in it. They agree to stand down only for Manuel to abruptly take over and make Havok destroy it on Emma's behalf.

Powers and abilities
Empath possesses the psionic ability to sense and manipulate the emotions of others. He can affect large groups of individuals at a time and can exert varying levels of empathic control over them, ranging from subtle manipulations that others are generally unaware of, to a complete negation of emotion that reduces them to a zombie-like state in which he can command them with little effort. His power operates by means of Empath's own brainwaves overriding the parts of the brain that govern emotion in others.

Reception
 In 2018, CBR.com ranked Empath 13th in their "20 Most Powerful Mutants From The '80s" list.

Other versions

Age of Apocalypse
In the Age of Apocalypse reality, Empath is held hostage by Mikhail Rasputin, who attaches the young mutant to a computer system in order to amplify his empathic abilities and control the human population of Eurasia. This causes Empath incredible agony, and when his handler, Keeper Murdock (the Age of Apocalypse's version of Daredevil), accidentally touches him, Murdock realizes the horrific pain the young man is in and ends his life.

References

External links
 Marvel Directory-Character Bio-Empath
 Uncannyxmen.net character bio on Empath

Comics characters introduced in 1984
Characters created by Chris Claremont
Fictional empaths
Fictional Spanish people
Marvel Comics mutants
Marvel Comics superheroes
Marvel Comics supervillains